Peter O'Heoghain was a priest in Ireland in the late 14th century: a Canon of Armagh he was Dean of Clogher in 1390.

References

14th-century Irish Roman Catholic priests
Deans of Clogher